Aktuellt i Politiken (Swedish: Current Issues in Politics; abbreviated as AiP) is a Swedish language political and news publication which is one of the media outlets of the Social Democratic Party. It has been in circulation since 1953.

History and profile
AiP was established by Sven Aspling in 1953 with the title Aktuellt i Politik och Samhälle. It has been part of AiP Media Produktion AB since 1999, a publishing company owned by the Swedish Social Democratic Party.

Until 1992 AiP was published 20 issues per year. Then the frequency was switched to weekly. The paper contains news, reports, analyses and comments.

The editors-in-chief of AiP include Åke Fors, Sven Dahlin, Macke Nilsson, Nils Hillén, Enn Kokk, Håkan Quisth, Peter Hultqvist, Ove Andersson, Eric Sundström, Jan Söderström and Fredrik Kornebäck. Since July 2019 Maria Persson has been the editor-in-chief and publisher of AiP, and Daniel Färm has been the director since 1 January 2021.

References

External links
 

1953 establishments in Sweden
Magazines established in 1953
Magazines published in Stockholm
News magazines published in Sweden
Political magazines published in Sweden
Swedish-language magazines
Swedish Social Democratic Party
Weekly magazines published in Sweden